Gregory James Fouratt (born 1965/1966) is the former United States Attorney for the District of New Mexico. Fouratt was appointed on January 25, 2008 by an administrative order issued by the U.S. Federal District Court of New Mexico.  He succeeded Larry Gomez, a temporary appointee of Acting United States Attorney General Peter D. Keisler, who had succeeded David Iglesias.

Biography
Fouratt, a career federal prosecutor, is an undergraduate of New Mexico State University and a graduate of Texas Tech University Law School.  He was also an officer in the U.S. Air Force and remains a member of the Air National Guard.  He is a self-described specialist in the areas of racketeering, capital murder and gang related crimes. He is currently serving as the Secretary of the New Mexico Department of Public Safety. On February 22, 2016, it was announced that Fouratt would be appointed as a U.S. Magistrate judge.

Notes

Living people
United States Attorneys for the District of New Mexico
New Mexico State University alumni
New Mexico lawyers
Year of birth missing (living people)
Place of birth missing (living people)